Vale of Leven Rovers Football Club was a Scottish association football club based in the city of Glasgow. The club was founded in 1874 and seems to have disbanded in 1876. 

The club entered the Scottish Cup in 1874–75 and 1875–76.  In 1874–75, the club lost at Kilmarnock in the first round, and scratched from the competition the following year, having been drawn to face Dumbreck.

The side to face Kilmarnock was:

There are references to a Glaswegian Vale of Leven Rovers in 1887 and 1892, but these almost certainly relate to different clubs, as there is no record of the Vale of Leven Rovers (Glasgow) between 1876 and 1887.

References 

Defunct football clubs in Scotland
Association football clubs established in 1874
1874 establishments in Scotland
Association football clubs disestablished in 1876
1876 disestablishments in Scotland